Queensgate is a neighborhood in Cincinnati, Ohio. It sits in the valley of Downtown Cincinnati and has been dominated by industrial and commercial warehouses for most of its history. Cincinnati's nickname of "Porkopolis" started here with hog slaughtering in the early 19th century.

History
Queensgate was formerly part of the West End, Cincinnati known as the Lower West End part of the neighborhood. The Metropolitan Master Plan of 1948, a City Plan for Cincinnati, called for slum clearance and urban renewal. Beginning in 1960, large tracts of the historic West End were razed.

The Queensgate I project came out of the 1948 Metropolitan Master Plan. It kickstarted urban renewal in the West End neighborhood, and led to the creation of a commercial/industrial complex, that is known as the neighborhood of Queensgate.

The population was only 142 at the 2010 census.

Main sights
Queensgate is home to Cincinnati Union Terminal. From 1884 to 1970, the Cincinnati Reds played at three separate parks at the intersection of Findlay Street and Western Avenue in Queensgate—the last 57½ of those years at Crosley Field. The former site of home plate of Crosley Field has been painted in an alley. Local Fox affiliate WXIX-TV (channel 19), owned by Gray Television, is based out of what was formerly the Harriet Beecher Stowe School, a majority-Black junior high school.

References

Neighborhoods in Cincinnati